Burwell-Morgan Mill, also known as the Millwood Mill, is a historic grist mill located at Millwood, Clarke County, Virginia.  It was built about 1785 by Gen. Daniel Morgan and Lt. Col. Nathaniel Burwell, who both served in the American Revolution. Burwell was the project's financier and Morgan managed the construction. The project overseer was L.H. Mongrul, whose initials and the date 1782 are carved in a stone in the mill's wall. The mill operated until the 1950s. In 1964 it was donated to the Clarke County Historical Association, which finished restoration in 1970 and operates the mill as a museum.

The mill is a two-story structure with gable roof measuring approximately 45 feet by 60 feet. It consists of a down slope basement and first level of stone topped by a frame second story and attic addition, added around 1876.  It features a rebuilt water wheel of Peruvian mahogany.

It was listed on the National Register of Historic Places in 1969. It is located in the Millwood Commercial Historic District. The nearby miller's house was restored in 1975.

References

External links

Burwell-Morgan Mill website
Burwell Mill, State Route 723, Millwood, Clarke County, VA at the Historic American Buildings Survey (HABS)

Grinding mills on the National Register of Historic Places in Virginia
National Register of Historic Places in Clarke County, Virginia
Industrial buildings completed in 1785
Buildings and structures in Clarke County, Virginia
Museums in Clarke County, Virginia
Mill museums in Virginia
Grinding mills in Virginia
Historic American Buildings Survey in Virginia
Individually listed contributing properties to historic districts on the National Register in Virginia